The 1999–2000 New Zealand Figure Skating Championships was held at the Queenstown Fun Centre in Queenstown from 14 through 16 September 1999. Skaters competed in the disciplines of men's singles and ladies' singles across many levels, including senior, junior, novice, adult, and the pre-novice disciplines of juvenile, pre-primary, primary, and intermediate.

Senior results

Men

Ladies

External links
 1999–2000 New Zealand Figure Skating Championships results

1999 in figure skating
New Zealand Figure Skating Championships
Figure Skating
September 1999 sports events in New Zealand